Antapistis is a genus of moths of the family Noctuidae.

Species
Antapistis holophaea (Hampson, 1926)
Antapistis leucospila (Walker, 1865)
Antapistis phoenicistes (Hampson, 1926)

References
Natural History Museum Lepidoptera genus database

Catocalinae
Noctuoidea genera